Mark Goldie  is an English historian and Professor of Intellectual History at Churchill College, Cambridge. He has written on the English political theorist John Locke and is a member of the Early Modern History and Political Thought and Intellectual History subject groups at the Faculty of History in Cambridge.

He was educated at the University of Sussex and obtained his PhD from Cambridge. In 1979 he was appointed college lecturer and a university lecturer in 1993. He is a Fellow of the Royal Historical Society.

Works
(editor, with Tim Harris and Paul Seaward), The Politics of Religion in Restoration England (Oxford: Blackwell, 1990).
(editor, with J. H. Burns), The Cambridge History of Political Thought, 1450-1700 (Cambridge University Press, 1991).
(editor), John Locke: Two Treatises of Government (London: Dent, Everyman Library; and Vermont: Charles E. Tuttle, 1993).
(editor), John Locke: Political Essays (Cambridge University Press, 1997).
(editor), The Reception of Locke's Politics, 6 vols. (London: Pickering and Chatto, 1999).
(editor), John Locke: Selected Correspondence (Oxford University Press, 2002).
(editor, with Robert Wokler), The Cambridge History of Eighteenth-Century Political Thought (Cambridge University Press, 2006).
(general editor), The Entring Book of Roger Morrice, 1677-1691, 6 vols. (Woodbridge: Boydell, 2007). 7th (Index) volume, 2009. Author of volume one: Roger Morrice and the Puritan Whigs.
(editor, with Geoffrey Kemp), Censorship of the Press, 1696-1720 (London: Pickering and Chatto, 2009).
(editor), John Locke: A Letter Concerning Toleration and Other Writings (Indianapolis: Liberty Fund, 2010).

References

Year of birth missing (living people)
Living people
English historians
Fellows of the Royal Historical Society
Members of the University of Cambridge faculty of history
Alumni of the University of Sussex
Fellows of Churchill College, Cambridge
Alumni of the University of Cambridge
Historians of political thought